Sally Barkow (born 10 July 1980) is an American Olympic sailor. She won the 2004 and 2005 ISAF Women's Match Racing World Championship, is a three-time winner of the International Women’s Keelboat Championship, and competed at the 2008 Summer Olympics.

She won the ICSA Women's Dinghy National Championship in 2002.

References

Living people
American female sailors (sport)
Olympic sailors of the United States
Sailors at the 2008 Summer Olympics – Yngling
US Sailor of the Year
Volvo Ocean Race sailors
Yngling class sailors
1980 births
Old Dominion Monarchs sailors
21st-century American women